Rafael Lasso de la Vega Iglesias, alias marqués de Villanova (February 1890 Seville - 1959 Spain) was a Spanish modernist poet. He collaborated with the creationist movement, the ultraist movement and the review Ultra. 
He lived for a long time in Florence where he was a friend of the Italian hermetic poets.

Works 
 Rimas de silencio y soledad (1910)
 "Las coronas de mirto" (1914)
 "Breviario sentimental" (1914)
 Prestigios (1916)
 "Las natividades" (1917)
 Presencias (1918)
 El corazón iluminado y otros poemas (1919)
 Galería de espejos (1919)
 "Creacionismo" (1920)
 "Estampa de Navidad" (1923)
 Pasaje de la poesía (1936)
 "Sagitario en la torre" (1936)
 "Arte menor" (1936)
 "El poeta desaparecido" (1940)
 Oaristes (1940)
 Constancias (1941)

References

Spanish poets
1890 births
1959 deaths